Ampelophaga khasiana, the scarce vine hawkmoth, is a moth of the family Sphingidae. It was described by Walter Rothschild in 1895. It is found from Nepal, Sikkim in north-eastern India and to central China.

The wingspan is 80–102 mm.

The larvae feed on Vitis species and Saurauia nepalensis in India.

References

khasiana
Moths described in 1895
Moths of Asia